Chondrosum is a genus of North American and South American plants in the grass family.

Chondrosum is closely related to Bouteloua and considered part of that genus in some publications.

 Species
 Chondrosum barbatum (Lag.) Clayton - United States (CA AZ NM TX OK KS CO UT NV MT), Mexico, Argentina
 Chondrosum brevisetum (Vasey) Clayton - United States (NM TX), widespread in Mexico
 Chondrosum chasei (Swallen) Clayton - Mexico (Coahuila, Nuevo León, San Luis Potosí)
 Chondrosum elatum (Reeder & C.Reeder) Clayton - Mexico (Colima, Chiapas, Oaxaca, Guerrero, Jalisco, Nayarit), Guatemala
 Chondrosum eriopodum Torr. - United States (CA AZ NM TX OK KS CO UT NV), Mexico (Sonora, Chihuahua, Coahuila, Durango, Zacatecas)
 Chondrosum eriostachyum (Swallen) Clayton - Mexico (Coahuila)
 Chondrosum gracile Kunth  - widespread in Canada, United States, Mexico; naturalized in China, Bangladesh, Saudi Arabia
 Chondrosum hirsutum (Lag.) Sweet - widespread in United States + Mexico + Guatemala
 Chondrosum karwinskyi E.Fourn. ex Hemsl. Mexico (San Luis Potosí, Coahuila, Durango, Zacatecas)
 Chondrosum kayi (Warnock) Clayton - Big Bend region of Texas
 Chondrosum parryi E.Fourn.  - United States (AZ NM TX), Mexico (Chihuahua, Sonora, Sinaloa)
 Chondrosum pectinatum (Feath.) Clayton USA (TX OK)
 Chondrosum scorpioides (Lag.) Kunth - northern + central Mexico
 Chondrosum simplex (Lag.) Kunth - United States (AZ NM TX NV UT CO KS NE WY), Mesoamerica, South America
 Chondrosum trifidum (Thurb.) Clayton - United States (CA AZ NM TX NV UT), northern Mexico

 formerly included
species now considered better suited to other genera: Bouteloua Chloris 
 Chondrosum ciliatum - Chloris radiata 
 Chondrosum humboldtianum - Bouteloua chondrosioides

See also
 List of Poaceae genera

References

Chloridoideae
Poaceae genera